The National Socialist Council of Nagaland (NSCN) is a Naga nationalist and separatist group operating mainly in Northeast India, with minor activities in northwest Myanmar (Burma). The main aim of the organisation is to establish a sovereign Naga state, "Nagalim", which would consist of all the areas belonging to the Naga people in Northeast India and northwest Myanmar. The NSCN's slogan is "Nagaland for Christ".

There are two major factions of the NSCN, NSCN-K, which was led by S. S. Khaplang, and NSCN-IM, which was led by Isak Chishi Swu and Thuingaleng Muivah. Smaller factions comprise the rest of the NSCN. In 2015, in response to an attack on an army convoy in Manipur, India designated the NSCN-K as a terrorist organization under the Unlawful Activities (Prevention) Act. India's Ministry of Home Affairs labels NSCN a major insurgent group.

History 
The word "Naga" denotes several ethnic tribes living on the Himalayan Range in Northeast India, which were brought under the control of British India during the 19th century. After India's independence, Naga leaders tried to assert independence. In 1975, the separatist Naga National Council (NNC) renounced violence and signed the Shillong Accord with the Government of India. Some of the NNC leaders disapproved of this peace treaty: these leaders included Isak Chishi Swu of the Sumi (Sema) tribe, Thuingaleng Muivah of the Tangkhul tribe, and S. S. Khaplang. These leaders broke off from the NNC and formed the National Socialist Council of Nagaland (NSCN) as a new separatist organisation. NSCN formed an underground Naga Federal Government having both civil and military wings. Later, a disagreement surfaced within the group's leaders over the issue of commencing dialogue with the Indian government. On 30 April 1988, the NSCN split into two factions; the NSCN-K led by Khaplang, and the NSCN-IM, led by Chishi Swu and Muivah. The split was accompanied by a spate of violence and clashes between the factions. In 1997, ceasefire agreements were made between the factions of the NSCN and India. Later, NSCN-K abrogated the ceasefire agreement.

On 6 April 2015, a new faction of the NSCN was formed. Y. Wangtin Konyak and P. Tikhak officially announced the formation of a new Naga political group going by the name "National Socialist Council of Nagaland (Reformation)" or NSCN-R. The decision came after Konyak, a senior minister, or Kilonser, of the NSCN-K and a personal secretary to founder Khaplang was expelled from the group after disagreements over its ceasefire agreement. The NSCN-R, wanted to continue with the ceasefire maintaining that "violence has never served a good purpose and the Naga political problem can only be resolved through peace and negotiation" while Khaplang had it abrogated because the "14 years of ceasefire between NSCN-K and India has become a mockery and futile exercise." Opposed to militant activities, the primary agenda of the NSCN-R would be to "develop a sense of brotherhood among the Naga family and to rebuild the trust and faith among the Naga society."
 
On 3 August 2015, NSCN-IM leaders Isak Swu and T. Muivah signed a peace framework agreement with the Government of India in the presence of Prime Minister Narendra Modi, Home Minister Rajnath Singh, and National Security Advisor Ajit Doval. Also in 2015, NSCN-K became affiliated with a militia organization named the United Liberation Front of Western South East Asia (UNLFW), a united front of Northeast Indian militant groups, and shortly after broke off peace talks with the Indian government. The UNLFW carried out the 2015 Manipur ambush, in which 18 soldiers of the Indian Army were killed and 15 were wounded.

Objectives and aims
The founding objective of the NSCN was to establish a sovereign Naga State by unifying all the Naga-inhabited areas in the North East of India and Northern Burma. The organisation referred to this Naga State as "Nagalim". Unification of all Naga tribes under one administration and the liberation of Nagalim from India through militant means was listed as one of the main objectives of the organisation. In the organisation's manifesto it stated that Nagalim would have a socialist economic system.

The NSCN has been widely described as both a Maoist and Christian group. Journalist Bertil Lintner has described NSCN's ideology as "a mixture of evangelical Christianity and revolutionary socialism". According to the NSCN manifesto, their slogan is "Nagaland for Christ". However, in an interview with BBC in 2005, when asked about the slogan "Nagaland for Christ" and if the Naga State will be a theocratic state, group leader Thuingaleng Muviah clarified that there had been a misunderstanding and that the slogan was not a law but rather was an aspiration of the group as more than 95% of Naga people are Christians. Muviah stated, "[the] Naga State has to be secular, if it is not secular then we would be betraying ourselves."

NSCN-IM, though it has signed a peace agreement with the Government of India, claims to uphold the founding objectives of the NSCM, with the integration of all the contiguous Naga areas under one administration being its prime goal. NSCN-K continues to engage in armed struggle with its ultimate goal being the formation of Nagalim, free of Indian influence and control.

Area of operation
The NSCN is active in Northeast India, with the group having its strongest influence and presence in the state of Nagaland and the hill districts of Manipur. It additionally maintains presences in Nagaland's neighbouring states of Assam and Arunachal Pradesh. Outside of India, the NSCN has operated in the Naga-inhabited regions of northern Myanmar.

Leadership and structure
Isak Chishi Swu and Thuingaleng Muivah, the founders of NSCN-IM, served as the inaugural Chairman and General Secretary of the group, respectively, and S. S. Khaplang served the Chairman of NSCN-K. In February 2019, Qhehezu Tuccu was unanimously elected as the Chairman of the NSCN-IM. The post had been vacant since the death of Chishi Swu. At the same meeting, Tongmeth Wangnao was elected as the vice-chairman of the NSCN-IM.
 
Politically, the NSCN has divided its area of influence into 11 administrative regions based on sub-tribe considerations and administrative convenience. In many areas, it runs a parallel government in opposition to the recognized Indian government. There are four major NSCN Ministries – Defence, Home, Finance, and Foreign Affairs. Moreover, there are five other minor Ministries including Education, Information and Publicity, Forests and Minerals, Law and Justice, and Religious Affairs. The most prominent among the group's nine Ministries is its "Home Ministry", which it considers to be "a replacement of the Indian state machinery". The heads of 11 administrative regions report to the head of the Home Ministry, referred to by the group as the "Kilo Kilonser". The devolution of the administrative arms of the organisation goes down to the town and village levels.

The group has also established a government-in-exile called the Government of the People's Republic of Nagaland (GPRN), which interacts with formal and non-formal world bodies and media. The GPRN has sent emissaries abroad to garner support and raise funds for the Naga cause.

Linkages
Over the years, the NSCN has developed extensive linkages both within and outside India. 

The NSCN has patronised smaller militant groups in Northeast India, training the groups in warfare and intelligence methods and providing them with logistics for waging war against India. The group has connections to India's Naxalite–Maoist groups and is a member of the UNLFW militant group united front.

The group has opened up contacts with international organizations like the United Nations Human Rights Council and the Working Group on Indigenous Populations. It is additionally a member of the Unrepresented Nations and Peoples Organization.

It is alleged by the Indian government that China and Pakistan provide financial support and weaponry to the NSCN. Knowledge of China's role in the Naga insurgency was expanded after the 2019 arrest of NSCN-IM leader Anthony Shimray. After his arrest, Shimray alleged that he was tasked by Chinese intelligence agencies to gather intelligence on Indian troop deployments in northeastern India. On 7 July 2019, the Indian Army busted an NSCN spy camp in Kekru Naga village. An additional four camps were targeted by Indian security forces.

Sources of funding
Drug trafficking and extortion are believed to be major sources of income for the NSCN. The group retains 70% of the income it generates while the remaining 30% is distributed to smaller ethnic insurgent groups operating in NSCN areas. 

The NSCN takes a 12% tax from the government employees living in NSCN areas and maintains a fixed house tax. For shops and commercial establishments operating in NSCN areas, the tax rate starts at a minimum of 5%.

Activities

On 4 June 2015, NSCN-K and Kanglei Yawol Kanna Lup ambushed an Indian Army convoy, killing 18 soldiers. On 10 June, India claimed that, in response to the ambush, it had conducted strikes against NSCN-K camps inside Myanmar, and inflicted significant casualties. Indian media reported that around 38 fighters belonging to NSCN-K were killed in the strikes. The Myanmar government, however, rejected Indian government claims. According to Myanmar government officials, the operation against NSCN insurgents took place entirely on the Indian side of the border and Indian troops did not cross into Myanmar. NSCN-K also rejected India's claims. According to NSCN-K, Indian troops did not attack any camp belonging to NSCN-K and the group did not suffer any losses. NSCN-K also challenged the Indian Army to display the dead bodies of those killed during the operation.

In February and June 2019, the Indian Army and the Burmese Tatmadaw carried out joint operations Sunrise and Sunrise II, cooperating to target several militant groups along the Indo-Burma border including the Kamtapur Liberation Organisation, the United Liberation Front of Assam (I), the National Democratic Front of Boroland, and NSCN-K. In February, Burmese troops stormed the NSCN-K headquarters in Taga. The Indian Army reciprocated by starting a major operation against the Arakan Army in south Mizoram.

On 21 May 2019, 11 people including the National People's Party member of the Legislative Assembly Tirong Aboh and his son, were killed in an ambush by unknown militants on Khonsa-Deomali road in Tirap District. In response to the ambush, the Indian Army launched various operations against the NSCN, which resulted in the confiscation of NSCN weapons and the detention of five suspected members of the group. 

In mid-July 2019, NSCN-IM militants opposed the implementation of the Register of Indigenous Inhabitants of Nagaland (RIIN); the group alleges that the push to implement the RIIN is "contradictory" to the inherent rights of the Naga people.

Controversies 
In 2015, it was reported by The Economist that the NSCN-K had previously been backed by India's intelligence agencies to divide other Naga separatist groups and weaken the Naga insurgency.

NSCN-IM has been accused of killing innocent people who speak against their aims or ideology. In September 2021, Athuan Abonmai, a Zeliangrong man from Grace Colony, was kidnapped and killed by NSCN-IM members.

See also
 Naga nationalism
 Insurgency in Northeast India
 Separatist movements of India

References

External links
 National Socialist Council of Nagaland – Isak-Muivah
 Northeast Echoes by Patricia Mukhim, Telegraph India, 22 June 2009
 Related Information/news for NSCN at KanglaOnline.com

Naga nationalism
Nationalist organizations
Separatism in Myanmar
Separatism in India
Socialist organizations
Organizations based in Asia designated as terrorist
Far-left politics
Members of the Unrepresented Nations and Peoples Organization
Paramilitary organisations based in Myanmar
Far-left politics in India
Christian terrorism in Asia
Organisations designated as terrorist by India
Left-wing militant groups in India
Communist militant groups
Rebel groups in Myanmar
1980 establishments in Nagaland